The Church of the Holy Ghost and St Stephen is a Catholic church at 44 Ashchurch Grove, White City, London W12.

The church and its attached presbytery is a Grade II listed building, built in 1903–04 and designed by the architect-priest Alexander Scoles.

References

Grade II listed buildings in the London Borough of Hammersmith and Fulham
Grade II listed churches in London